Bartonella mastomydis is a bacterium from the genus Bartonella which has been isolated from the Guinea multimammate mouse from Sine-Saloum in Senegal.

References

Bartonellaceae
Bacteria described in 2018